Huntington Park is an eastern suburb of the city of Auckland, New Zealand. The area is bounded on the north by Ti Rakau Drive, on the east by Te Irirangi Drive, and to the south and west by the Greenmount Drainage Reserve. The area is called Greenmount on some maps. The northeast corner contains The Hub shopping mall.

Most of the houses were built in the 1990s. Even in 1998, the area was rural.

The Guy family farmed in the area for 40 years from the late 19th century. The Guy homestead, built in 1898, was badly damaged by a suspected arson in 2012. The house was later restored.

The Hub Botany shopping centre opened in Huntington Park in 2001. It has 200 stores, including a Countdown supermarket.

Demographics

Huntington Park had a population of 1,902 at the 2018 New Zealand census, a decrease of 72 people (−3.6%) since the 2013 census, and an increase of 54 people (2.9%) since the 2006 census. There were 795 households, comprising 879 males and 1,020 females, giving a sex ratio of 0.86 males per female. The median age was 41.7 years (compared with 37.4 years nationally), with 273 people (14.4%) aged under 15 years, 327 (17.2%) aged 15 to 29, 870 (45.7%) aged 30 to 64, and 432 (22.7%) aged 65 or older.

Ethnicities were 47.2% European/Pākehā, 3.2% Māori, 2.2% Pacific peoples, 45.4% Asian, and 6.3% other ethnicities. People may identify with more than one ethnicity.

The percentage of people born overseas was 59.0, compared with 27.1% nationally.

Although some people chose not to answer the census's question about religious affiliation, 39.0% had no religion, 38.3% were Christian, 5.7% were Hindu, 3.8% were Muslim, 3.9% were Buddhist and 3.8% had other religions.

Of those at least 15 years old, 459 (28.2%) people had a bachelor's or higher degree, and 198 (12.2%) people had no formal qualifications. The median income was $31,300, compared with $31,800 nationally. 291 people (17.9%) earned over $70,000 compared to 17.2% nationally. The employment status of those at least 15 was that 732 (44.9%) people were employed full-time, 189 (11.6%) were part-time, and 66 (4.1%) were unemployed.

References

Suburbs of Auckland